Tuna Clipper is a 1949 American drama film directed by William Beaudine and starring Roddy McDowall, Elena Verdugo and Roland Winters. It was one of a series of films McDowall made for Monogram.

Plot
A young man goes to work on a tuna boat to earn money to pay off debts.
When his friend Frankie Pereira fails to place the wager of a ruffian named Ransom at the racetrack and the 10-to-1 longshot wins, Alec MacLennan is left holding the bag after Frankie flees. Forced to pay off the debt, Alec takes a job on the Pereira family's tuna fishing boat.

Frankie's tough brother Silvestre objects to Alec's presence and bullies him. After a while, their sister Bianca notices that the hard-working Alec never has any of his salary. She finds out how he is being extorted by Ransom, who is doing likewise to her brother after finding Frankie working as a stable boy at the track. Ransom's chicanery discovered, Alec is forgiven by all.

Cast
 Roddy McDowall as Alec MacLennan 
 Elena Verdugo as Bianca Pereira 
 Roland Winters as E.J. Ransom 
 Peter Mamakos as Capt. Manuel Pereira 
 Rick Vallin as Silvestre Pereira  
 Michael Vallon as Papa Pereira 
 Russell Simpson as Capt. Fergus MacLennan 
 Doris Kemper as Anne MacLennan 
 Dickie Moore as Frankie Pereira 
 Richard Avonde as Pete, a Pereira crewman 
 Victor Sen Yung as Oriental Dock Worker

Reception
The film was reviewed by François Truffaut who described it as "A scenario whose charm lies in its modesty and honesty".

References

Bibliography
 Dixon, Wheeler Winston. Early Film Criticism of François Truffaut. Indiana University Press, 1993. 
 Marshall, Wendy L. William Beaudine: From Silents to Television. Scarecrow Press, 2005.

External links

1949 films
American drama films
American black-and-white films
1949 drama films
Films directed by William Beaudine
Monogram Pictures films
Seafaring films
Films produced by Lindsley Parsons
1940s English-language films
1940s American films